This is a list of Xavier Musketeers football players in the NFL Draft.

Key

Selections

References

Xavier

Xavier
Xavier Musketeers NFL Draft